Troika or troyka (from Russian тройка, meaning 'a set of three') may refer to:

Cultural tradition
 Troika (dance), a Russian folk dance
 Troika (driving), a traditional Russian harness driving combination, a cultural icon of Russia

Politics
 Triumvirate, a political regime ruled or dominated by three powerful individuals, usually troika in the context of the Soviet Union and Russia
 Troika (Soviet leadership), one of the temporary triumvirates in the Soviet Union
 European troika, the decision group formed by the European Commission (EC), the European Central Bank (ECB) and the International Monetary Fund (IMF)
 OSCE troika, the leadership of the Organization for Security and Co-operation in Europe: the chairman-in-office and the previous and incoming chairmen-in-office
 NKVD troika, a commission of three for express judgment in the Soviet Union during the time of Joseph Stalin
 Troika (Tunisia), a three-party alliance that governed Tunisia from 2011 to 2014
 "The troika" during the U.S. presidency of Ronald Reagan: James Baker, Ed Meese, and Michael Deaver
 Troika of tyranny, a term coined by John R. Bolton for three Central and South American nations (Cuba, Nicaragua and Venezuela)

Arts and entertainment

Literature
 The Troika, a 1997 novel by Stepan Chapman
 Troika, a 1979 novel by David Gurr
 Troika, a  2011 novella by Alastair Reynolds
 Troika, the fourth novel of the Indigo Saga by Louise Cooper
 Tale of the Troika, a novel by Russian authors Arkady and Boris Strugatsky

Music
 "Troika", the first movement of The Blizzard suite by Georgy Sviridov (1974, movie version — 1964)
 Troika (album), by Julia Kogan, 2011
 Troika (D'Virgilio, Morse & Jennings album), 2022
 "Troika", the fourth movement of Suite from Lieutenant Kijé by Prokofiev
 "Troika", the eleventh movement of The Seasons by Tchaikovsky

Other uses in arts and entertainment
 Troika (video game), a 1991 video game
 Troika, a painting by Vasily Perov
 Troika (series), a 2010 Israeli-Russian short TV series by Leonid Prudovsky
 Troyka, a British jazz band featuring pianist Kit Downes

Businesses
 Troika Games, a video games developer 1998–2005
 Troika Pottery, a Cornish pottery company 1963–1983
 Troika Dialog, the former name of Sberbank CIB, a multinational investment banking and asset management firm

Other uses
 Troika (chocolate), a confection by Nidar AS, Norway
 Troika (crater), on Mars
 Troika (ride), an amusement park ride
 The Troika (Kuala Lumpur), a condominium in Kuala Lumpur, Malaysia
 Troika card, a contactless reusable card designed to pay for public transport in Moscow, Russia
 VAZ-2103, a Soviet sedan car nicknamed Troika

See also
 
 Trojka (disambiguation)
 Three of a kind (disambiguation)
 Threesome (disambiguation)
 Troyca, a Japanese animation studio